Maurice Alden Bugbee (October 17, 1914 – November 12, 1975) was an American football and basketball coach. He served as the head football coach at Aurora University in Aurora, Illinois from 1939 to 1941. He served as the school's head basketball coach from 1941 to 1942.

Bugbee later moved to Long Beach, California, where he was the executive director of the local Boys Club.

Head coaching record

Football

References

1914 births
1975 deaths
Aurora Spartans football coaches
Aurora Spartans men's basketball coaches
Sportspeople from Illinois